Chalgany is a rural locality (a selo) in Chalgansky Selsoviet of Magdagachinsky District, Amur Oblast, Russia. The population was 406 as of 2018. There are 7 streets.

Geography 
Chalgany is located 98 km southeast of Magdagachi (the district's administrative centre) by road. Tygda is the nearest rural locality.

References 

Rural localities in Magdagachinsky District